The Nokia 5610 is a slider mobile phone from Nokia part of the XpressMusic series. Introduced August 2007 and launched in December, it runs on the Series 40 platform. The 5610's design is similar to that of the Nokia 5310 XpressMusic (announced same day), with aluminium brushed sides and bold side colours of either red, blue, white, or pink. Above the regular D-pad with music buttons, the 5610 features a "sliding switch" below the display for navigation. The phone is shown on Panic! at the Disco "That Green Gentleman (Things Have Changed)" music video.

LCD screen issues
This phone has a known LCD screen defect that causes the screen to cease functioning. T-Mobile was aware of this and only temporarily halted sales before putting the phone back on the market, regardless of the problem never being fixed. Upon further investigation, it appears as though the connector to the LCD becomes worn down and the protective layer breaks due to friction from operation of the slider.

See also
Nokia N81
Sony Ericsson W910
Sony Ericsson W760
Sony Ericsson W595
Samsung J610
LG Shine

External links
 Nokia 5610 Device Details
 Nokia 5610 on Nokia Europe
 Nokia 5610 review on GSM Arena

References 

5610
Mobile phones introduced in 2007
Slider phones